NHL 2017 may refer to:
2016–17 NHL season
2017–18 NHL season
NHL 17, video game
2017 National Hurling League